The rappers are listed by the first letter in their name (not including the words "a", "an", or "the"). This list only includes artists that have a Wikipedia page.

The list refers to rappers of a specific subgenre, not all hip hop artists.

0–9

100s
11/5
187 Fac
213
24kGoldn
2Mex
2nd II None
2Pac
3X Krazy
42 Dugg

A

Ab-Soul
Above the Law
Aceyalone
Adrian Marcel
Afroman
Ahmad
Akiva Schaffer
Akwid
Alchemist
Aminé
Anderson .Paak
Andre Nickatina
Andy Samberg
Anotha Level
Arabian Prince

B

B2K
B.G. Knocc Out
B-Legit
B-Real
Baby Keem
Bad Azz
Beautiful Eulogy
Becky G
Berner
Big Sean
Big Syke
Bishop Lamont
BJ The Chicago Kid
Black Eyed Peas
Black Hippy
Blackalicious
Bloods & Crips
Blu
Blu & Exile
Blueface
Blxst
Bobby Brackins
Bohemia
Boogie
Bow Wow
Braille
Brainwash Projects
Brandy Norwood
Brotha Lynch Hung
Brownside
Butch Cassidy

C

C-BO
CJ Mac
Cali Swag District
Capital Punishment Organization
Casey Veggies
Cashis
Celly Cel
Charizma
Childish Gambino
Chilly Chill
Chuck Inglish
The Click
Clyde Carson
Cold 187um (Big Hutch)
College Boyz
Compton's Most Wanted
The Conscious Daughters
Coolio
Cool Nutz
Cougnut
The Coup
Cozz
Crooked I

D

The D.O.C.
Da Lench Mob
Dame D.O.L.L.A
The Dangerous Crew
Darkroom Familia
Daz Dillinger
Death Grips
Dej Loaf
Del the Funky Homosapien
Delinquent Habits
Digital Underground
Dilated Peoples
Dizzy Wright
DJ Fresh
DJ Mustard
DJ Pooh
DJ Quik
DJ Shadow
DJ Yella
D-Shot
Doggy's Angels
Doja Cat
Dom Kennedy
Domino
Domo Genesis
Dove Cameron
Down AKA Kilo
The Dove Shack
Dr. Dre
Drakeo the Ruler
Dresta
Dru Down
Dubb Union
Dumbfoundead

E

E-40
E-A-Ski
Earl Sweatshirt
Eazy-E 
Egyptian Lover
Emcee N.I.C.E.
Eric Bellinger
Evidence

F

Fashawn
The Federation
Foesum
Funkdoobiest
Funky Aztecs
Futuristic

G

G-Eazy
G Herbo
Gabe Rosales
The Game
Get Busy Committee
Gift of Gab
Glasses Malone
Goldie Loc
Gospel Gangstaz
Greydon Square
The Grouch
Guerilla Black

H

HBK Gang
Hailee Steinfeld
Haiku D'Etat
Hayley Kiyoko
Havoc
Hed PE
Hi-C
Hieroglyphics
Hodgy Beats
Hopsin
Hot Dollar
House of Pain
Husalah

I

Iamsu!
Ice Cube
Ice-T
Illmaculate
Imani
Insane Poetry

J

J-Flexx
J.J. Fad
J.Lately
J Stalin
JT the Bigga Figga
J. Wells
The Jacka
Jaden Smith
Jake One
Jasmine V
Jay Rock
Jayo Felony
Johnny Richter
Jonn Hart
Jonwayne
Jorma Taccone
Joyo Velarde
Juice Wrld

K

K-Dee
Kam
Kanye West
Katy Perry
Kausion
Keak da Sneak
Kendrick Lamar
Kid Frost
Kid Ink
Kid Sensation
King Tee
Kingspade
King Lil G
Kitty Pryde
Knight Owl
Knoc-Turn'Al
Kokane
Kottonmouth Kings
Kreayshawn
Krondon
Kung Fu Vampire
Kurupt
Kyle

L

LA Dream Team
L.A. Posse
LA Symphony
Lady of Rage
Larry June
Lateef the Truthspeaker
Latyrx
Lazarus 
LBC Crew
Left Brain
Lifesavas
Lighter Shade of Brown
Likwit Crew
Lil B
Lil Debbie
Lil Eazy-E
Lil Mosey
Lil Ric
Lil Rob
Lil Xan
Living Legends
Locksmith
The Lonely Island
Lootpack
Lords of Lyrics
LoveRance
LPG
Luckyiam
Luni Coleone
Luniz
Lyrics Born

M

Mac Dre
Mac Mall
Mac Minister
Mack 10
Macklemore
Madchild
Madlib
Mann
Marc E. Bassy
Mars
Marvaless
Marques Houston
MC Eiht
MC Hammer
MC Ren
MC Smooth
MC Trouble
Mellow Man Ace
Menace Clan
Menajahtwa
Messy Marv
Mike G
Mike Shinoda
Mindless Behavior
Mistah F.A.B.
Mista Grimm
Mitchy Slick
Mopreme Shakur
Mount Westmore
Mozzy
Mr. Capone-E
Mr. Doctor
Mr. Malik
Ms. Toi
Murs

N

N2Deep
Nate Dogg
Nationwide Rip Ridaz
NB Ridaz
Nef the Pharaoh
New Boyz
Nick Cannon
Nipsey Hussle
NoClue
Numskull
N.W.A
Neffex

O

OMG
Oaktown 3.5.7
Odd Future
One Block Radius
O.T Genasis

P

PSD
Pac Div
The Pack
Paperboy
Paris
Peace 586
Penthouse Players Clique
People Under The Stairs
The Pharcyde
Pigeon John
Planet Asia
Playa Hamm
Polo G
Potluck
Problem
Propaganda
Proper Dos
Psycho Realm
Psychosiz

Q

Quasimoto
Quo

R

RBL Posse
RBX
Rappin' 4-Tay
Ras Kass
Rasco
Ray J
Ray Luv
The Real Richie Rich
Redfoo
Rexx Life Raj
RiceGum
Richie Rich
Rob $tone
Roddy Ricch
Rodney O & Joe Cooley
Roshon Fegan
Rydah J. Klyde

S

Saafir
Sage the Gemini
Saint Dog
Sam Sneed
San Quinn
Saweetie
Schoolboy Q
Seagram
Sen Dog
Shade Sheist
Shoreline Mafia
Shorty Mack
Sir Jinx
Sir Mix-a-Lot
Skee-Lo
Slim the Mobster
Smooth
Smoov-E
Snoop Dogg
Snow Tha Product
SOB X RBE
Souls of Mischief
South Central Cartel
Soopafly
Spice 1
Spider Loc
Stat Quo
Steady Mobb'n
Storm
Strong Arm Steady
Stunnaman
Subnoize Souljaz
Suga Free
Suga T
Sunspot Jonz
SwizZz
Swollen Members
Sylk-E. Fyne

T

T-Bone
T. Mills
Tash
The Team
Tech N9ne
Techniec
Tha Alkaholiks
Tha Dogg Pound
Tha Realest
The Rej3ctz
Thurzday
Tone Lōc
Too $hort
Totally Insane
Trackademicks
Travis Knight
Traxamillion
Tray Deee
Trevor Jackson
Tunnel Rats
Turf Talk
Tweedy Bird Loc
Twinz
Twista
Twisted Insane
Ty Dolla $ign
Tyga
Tyler, The Creator

U

U-n-i
The Unknown DJ

V

V-Nasty
Vince Staples
Volume 10

W

WC
WC and the Maad Circle
Warren G
Chanel West Coast
Westside Connection
WILLOW
World Class Wreckin' Cru

X

X-Raided
Xzibit

Y

YG
Yella
Yomo & Maulkie
Young De
Young Lay
Young Maylay
Young Murder Squad
Young Noble
Young Soldierz
Yo-Yo
Yukmouth
Yung Berg

Z

Zion I

West Coast
Lists of American musicians